Chinta Ravi Bala Krishna is a winner of the Sangeet Natak Akademi’s Ustad Bismillah Khan Yuva Puraskar for 2009, a recipient of the singular honor of Yuva Sutradhari at the Siddhendra Yogi Nrityotsav in 2007, a Gold Medallist M.A Kuchipudi, as well as being a winner of a host of other awards.

References

External links
 Interview With Bala Krishna
 Kuchipudi Vaibhavam

Kuchipudi exponents
Living people
Year of birth missing (living people)